Richard Peter Stanley (born June 23, 1944) is an Emeritus Professor of Mathematics at the Massachusetts Institute of Technology, in Cambridge, Massachusetts. From 2000 to 2010, he was the Norman Levinson Professor of Applied Mathematics.   He received his Ph.D. at Harvard University in 1971 under the supervision of Gian-Carlo Rota. He is an expert in the field of combinatorics and its applications to other mathematical disciplines.

Contributions 
Stanley is known for his two-volume book Enumerative Combinatorics (1986–1999). He is also the author of Combinatorics and Commutative Algebra (1983) and well over 200 research articles in mathematics.  He has served as thesis advisor to more than 58 doctoral students, many of whom have had distinguished careers in combinatorial research. Donald Knuth named Stanley as one of his combinatorial heroes in a 2023 interview.

Awards and honors 
Stanley's distinctions include membership in the National Academy of Sciences (elected in 1995), the 2001 Leroy P. Steele Prize for Mathematical Exposition, the 2003 Schock Prize,  a plenary lecture at the International Congress of Mathematicians (in Madrid, Spain), and election in 2012 as a fellow of the American Mathematical Society. In 2022 he was awarded the Leroy P. Steele Prize for Lifetime Achievement.

Selected publications 
 Stanley, Richard P. (1996).  Combinatorics and Commutative Algebra, 2nd ed.  .
 Stanley, Richard P. (1997, 1999).  Enumerative Combinatorics, Volumes 1 and 2. Cambridge University Press.  , 0-521-56069-1.

See also 
 Exponential formula
 Order polynomial
 Stanley decomposition
 Stanley's reciprocity theorem

References

External links 
 Richard Stanley's Homepage

1944 births
Living people
Members of the United States National Academy of Sciences
Fellows of the American Mathematical Society
20th-century American mathematicians
21st-century American mathematicians
Combinatorialists
Harvard University alumni
Massachusetts Institute of Technology School of Science faculty
Rolf Schock Prize laureates
Educators from New York City
Mathematicians from New York (state)